Trent Garrett (born March 2, 1984) is an American actor and model best known for his roles as Bowie Quinn on the Disney Channel series Andi Mack, Wes on Splitting Up Together, and John on Maggie.

Personal life
Trent Garrett was born on March 2, 1984. He was born and raised in Hampton, Virginia. Garrett was the kicker on the Grafton High School football team.
Garrett has a son born in 2015. He married Canadian actress Cassie Steele in 2018.

Career
Garrett's film roles include Austin Banks in Boost, Jason in Pocket Listing, and Larry in Martial Science. His first major television role was as Asher Pike in 91 episodes of All My Children. In 2012, he had a recurring role on the ABC Family series, Make It or Break It, playing Brad, who is training to go to the 2012 Olympics for cycling. In 2017, he landed the recurring role of Bowie, Andi's father on the Disney Channel's hit show Andi Mack, and in Season 3 he was promoted to a series regular. In 2018, he joined the cast of the ABC sitcom Splitting Up Together. In 2021, he played the role of Parker Freeman on the TNT drama series Animal Kingdom. In 2022, he played the role of John on the Hulu comedy series Maggie.

Filmography

Film

Television

Web

Music video
Joss Stone (Super Duper Love)

References

External links

Trent Garrett at Models.com

American male soap opera actors
American male television actors
Living people
People from Hampton, Virginia
Male actors from Virginia
Male models from Virginia
1984 births